Cust is a rural village in the South Island of New Zealand. It is located in North Canterbury and comes under seat of the Waimakariri District Council. It is located approximately 16 km east of Oxford and 17 km west of Rangiora. The town is named after Sir Edward Cust, who was a member of the Canterbury Association which organised European settlement of the area around 1850. Earlier names for the town were Moeraki Downs and Middleton-on-the-Cust.

Education
Cust School is Cust's only school. It is a state co-educational full primary school with a decile rating of 10 and a roll of  students (as of  The principal is Robert Schuyt.

Demographics
It is part of the wider Starvation Hill-Cust statistical area.

Cust had a population of 390 at the 2018 New Zealand census, an increase of 27 people (7.4%) since the 2013 census, and an increase of 36 people (10.2%) since the 2006 census. There were 144 households. There were 192 males and 195 females, giving a sex ratio of 0.98 males per female, with 78 people (20.0%) aged under 15 years, 42 (10.8%) aged 15 to 29, 177 (45.4%) aged 30 to 64, and 90 (23.1%) aged 65 or older.

Ethnicities were 97.7% European/Pākehā, 3.8% Māori, 1.5% Pacific peoples and 1.5% other ethnicities (totals add to more than 100% since people could identify with multiple ethnicities).

Although some people objected to giving their religion, 53.8% had no religion, 30.0% were Christian, 1.5% were Buddhist and 1.5% had other religions.

Of those at least 15 years old, 60 (19.2%) people had a bachelor or higher degree, and 48 (15.4%) people had no formal qualifications. The employment status of those at least 15 was that 147 (47.1%) people were employed full-time, 48 (15.4%) were part-time, and 0 (0.0%) were unemployed.

Starvation Hill-Cust statistical area

Starvation Hill-Cust had a population of 2,217 at the 2018 New Zealand census, an increase of 267 people (13.7%) since the 2013 census, and an increase of 828 people (59.6%) since the 2006 census. There were 798 households. There were 1,092 males and 1,125 females, giving a sex ratio of 0.97 males per female. The median age was 46.1 years (compared with 37.4 years nationally), with 462 people (20.8%) aged under 15 years, 270 (12.2%) aged 15 to 29, 1,095 (49.4%) aged 30 to 64, and 393 (17.7%) aged 65 or older.

Ethnicities were 95.3% European/Pākehā, 4.6% Māori, 0.3% Pacific peoples, 1.5% Asian, and 2.4% other ethnicities (totals add to more than 100% since people could identify with multiple ethnicities).

The proportion of people born overseas was 19.9%, compared with 27.1% nationally.

Although some people objected to giving their religion, 55.5% had no religion, 34.5% were Christian, 0.4% were Buddhist and 1.6% had other religions.

Of those at least 15 years old, 360 (20.5%) people had a bachelor or higher degree, and 267 (15.2%) people had no formal qualifications. The median income was $36,700, compared with $31,800 nationally. The employment status of those at least 15 was that 909 (51.8%) people were employed full-time, 315 (17.9%) were part-time, and 27 (1.5%) were unemployed.

Motorcycle racing
For more than 20 years, a metalled-road racing circuit at Cust was used as the  venue for the New Zealand Grand Prix for motorcycling. The Easter event, last held in 1963, would swell the village population to 25,000.

Climate
The average temperature in summer is 16.2 °C, and in winter is 5.9 °C.

References

External links

 Cust village website
 Cust School
 Cust Volunteer Fire Brigade

Waimakariri District
Populated places in Canterbury, New Zealand